Wang Zhenpeng (born 5 May 1984) is a Chinese-born Hong Kong professional footballer who currently plays as a goalkeeper for Hong Kong Premier League club Kitchee.

Club career

Dalian Shide
Wang Zhenpeng started his professional football career in 2002 when he was promoted to the senior team of top tier Chinese side Dalian Shide. Throughout the season he was used as a third choice goalkeeper and did not see any playing time, however he did see his side win the 2002 league title that season and did pick up a medal. His time at Dalian, however would see him struggle to receive any playing time and he would even struggle to even maintain his third choice position within the team by the 2005 league season, which saw him dropped from the first team squad.

Kitchee
This would see Wang move to Hong Kong-based club Kitchee during 2005 and make his league debut on 18 September 2005 against Sun Hei in a 2–0 victory. As the season progressed he will go on to become the club's first choice goalkeeper and play in twelve games at the end of the 2005–06 league campaign that saw Kitchee win the Hong Kong Senior Challenge Shield, while also coming fourth within the league.

The following season would see Wang face stiff competition from Hong Kong U-23 goalkeeper Li Jian and only play in ten league games, however he was able to regain his place within the team and play in the final of the Hong Kong Senior Challenge Shield on 23 December 2007, but Wang did not have a good game and saw himself commit two goalkeeping mistakes that led to Kitchee losing 2–0 to Eastern. Despite the disappointment Wang would still remain the club's main goalkeeper and play in the final that won the 2006–07 Hong Kong League Cup as well as starting the following season as the first choice where he played in fifteen league games throughout the 2007–08 league campaign. By finishing in a disappointing sixth the club's manager Julio César Moreno would decide to drop Wang during the 2008–09 season and replace him with Song Tao and Luciano, which saw Wang only play in six league games at the end of the season.

Kitchee would bring in Josep Gombau as their new manager in the 2009–10 league season and he would make Sergio Aure his first choice goalkeeper. Wang would only play in five league games throughout the season and sat on the bench while the club won the 2009 Hong Kong Community Shield, however he would win back his position as the club's main goalkeeper in the 2010–11 league season when he played in all but one game throughout the league season as Kitchee won the league title for the first time since 1964.

International career
Zhenpeng has been called up several times to the Hong Kong national football team, without making an appearance. On 3 June 2016, he made his international debut against Vietnam during the 2016 AYA Bank Cup.

Career statistics

Club

 Statistics accurate as of 22 May 2021

International

Honours

Club
Dalian Shide
Chinese Jia-A League/Chinese Super League: 2002, 2005
Chinese FA Cup: 2005

Kitchee
Hong Kong Premier League: 2014–15, 2016–17, 2017–18, 2019–20
Hong Kong First Division: 2010–11, 2011–12, 2013–14
Hong Kong Senior Shield: 2005–06, 2016–17, 2018–19
Hong Kong FA Cup: 2011–12, 2012–13, 2014–15, 2016–17, 2017–18, 2018–19
Hong Kong Sapling Cup: 2017–18, 2019–20
Hong Kong League Cup: 2005–06, 2006–07, 2011–12, 2014–15, 2015–16
Hong Kong Community Cup: 2016–17, 2017–18
AFC Cup Play-off: 2015–16

References

External links

Player profile at Kitchee.com
Player profile at Sohu.com

1984 births
Living people
Hong Kong footballers
Hong Kong international footballers
Chinese footballers
Chinese expatriate footballers
Expatriate footballers in Hong Kong
Footballers from Dalian
Dalian Shide F.C. players
Hong Kong First Division League players
Hong Kong Premier League players
Kitchee SC players
Association football goalkeepers
Hong Kong League XI representative players